Fine Just the Way It Is  is a 2008 collection of short stories by Annie Proulx.

Stories

Family Man
The story is set in a Wyoming "Old Folks' Home" for old cowboys, ranchers and their womenfolk.  Old cow-poke Ray Forkenbrock has skeletons in his closet he must talk about before he dies. The past is inescapable.  Mid-way through relating his early life to his granddaughter, Forkenbrock realizes that one of his fellow residents is the woman he first had sex with 71 years before; a day later that same woman falls to her death in the Grand Canyon. Forkenbrock had discovered, at his father's funeral, that he was not his father's only son called Ray.  He was in fact one of four: his father had four families, the children all named the same to avoid mistakes.

I've Always Loved This Place
Satan's personal assistant, one Duane Fork, busies himself spreading dust and sulfurous smells for his boss's return from a Milan design fair. The Devil is piqued by an article in The Onion reporting that a Tenth Circle of Hell had been added to accommodate Total Bastards.

Them Old Cowboy Songs
Rose and Archie are a young married couple—Archie is only 16—setting out to make a life for themselves. At first, things are idyllic: they are very much in love. But then Archie gets laid off from the ranch where he has been working and heads to Cheyenne to find a job, leaving Rose behind in their cabin with a baby on the way. He has to hide that he is married because the tyrant he works for would fire him if he knew, since married men tend to want time off to go visit their wives. He tries to write a letter to Rose but does not have the money for a stamp. Meanwhile, Rose is alone and miserable. There are complications with her pregnancy, and no way for her to get help. She finally buries the baby. Archie, after a fall in a bog, comes down with pneumonia and cannot work, so his boss fires him. Another hand tries to help Archie get home but they get caught in a blizzard and freeze to death. In the spring, a friend of Archie and Rose comes by and finds her mutilated body.

The Sagebrush Kid
A childless Wyoming couple transfer their affections first to a piglet, then to a chicken, and finally to a sagebrush they fancy to have the appearance of a child. It is tended and protected, and even fed bones and stray scraps of meat from their dinner-table.  Even after the couples' passing, the shrub – now grown to the height of a fair-sized tree – is used to human attention, and meat.  It consumes livestock, then soldiers, then a local medico, railroad men, surveyors, and most lately a botanist come to investigate its unusual height and luxuriance.

Deep-Blood-Greasy-Bowl

Swamp Mischief

Testimony of the Donkey

Tits-Up in a ditch

Critical reception
Delia Falconer described the stories as a "patchy collection, much less satisfying than Close Range". The stories set in Hell have also been criticized as—while being witty and well-written—ill-fitted to a book of Wyoming stories.

Relation to other short story collections
Writing in The New York Times, Ron Carlson described the collection as "a third collection of Wyoming stories", following Close Range and Bad Dirt.

References

External links
 Amazon.com user reviews of "Fine Just the Way It Is" at Amazon.com
 barnesandnoble user reviews of "Fine Just the Way It Is" at Barnes & Noble
 Tenth Circle Added To Rapidly Growing Hell at theonion.com

American short story collections
Works by Annie Proulx
2008 short story collections
HarperCollins books